Behnoosh Bakhtiari (born May 19, 1975) is an Iranian actress.

She has a bachelor's degree in French from the Islamic Azad University, Tehran Branch. Behnoosh Bakhtiari was nominated for the Crystal Simorgh for Best Supporting Actress at the 34th Fajr Film Festival in 2015 for her role in my film.

Filmography

TV Series

Movies

References

External links

1975 births
Living people
Actresses from Tehran
Iranian film actresses
Iranian stand-up comedians
Iranian television actresses
Islamic Azad University alumni